Dmitriy Koblov (Kazakh: Дмитрий Коблов; born 30 November 1992) is a Kazakhstani athlete competing in the 400 metres hurdles. He represented his country at the 2016 Summer Olympics without advancing from the first round.

His personal best in the event is 49.39 seconds set in Bishkek in 2016.

International competitions

1Did not finish in the semifinals

References

1992 births
Living people
Kazakhstani male hurdlers
Athletes (track and field) at the 2014 Asian Games
Athletes (track and field) at the 2018 Asian Games
Athletes (track and field) at the 2016 Summer Olympics
Olympic athletes of Kazakhstan
Asian Games medalists in athletics (track and field)
Asian Games silver medalists for Kazakhstan
Medalists at the 2018 Asian Games
Competitors at the 2013 Summer Universiade
Competitors at the 2015 Summer Universiade
Competitors at the 2017 Summer Universiade
21st-century Kazakhstani people